Franz Josef Thiele, or František Thiele (9 March 1868, Frýdlant - 23 May 1945, Prague) was a Czech painter and university Professor.

Life and work 
His father, also named Franz, was a weaver. After completing his primary education in 1883, he received a scholarship, sponsored by the  family, and went to Vienna. Following a year of introductory courses at the School of Applied Arts, he studied at the Academy of Fine Arts with August Eisenmenger, Franz Rumpler and Christian Griepenkerl. 

In 1892, he was awarded a stipend to study in Italy. From 1894, he established himself in Vienna. He made numerous trips throughout Western Europe, and visited Tunisia. Two years later, he was appointed an Associate Professor at the Academy of Fine Arts, Prague, and  became a full Professor in 1905; a position he would hold until 1938. He volunteered for service in 1916, and worked as a war artist on several fronts for a year. 

During this period, he received several awards, including the Knight's Cross of the Order of Franz Joseph, the Order of the Iron Crown, and the Order of Saint Anna.  

He was married twice; in 1909 to Maria Starou then, in 1927, to the painter, Inge Peschka (1903-1993), with whom he had a son. 

He retired in 1938, following the German occupation of Czechoslovakia. His next work was a propaganda poster, showing Hitler in front of a cheering crowd. Some of his paintings were purchased by Hitler and Joseph Goebbels. Near the end of the war, he and Inge were sent to a detention center operated by Czech patriots. He did not survive. Some sources indicate he may have been lynched. He was buried in a mass grave near Prague.

References 

 "Thiele, Franz". In: Hans Vollmer (Ed.): Allgemeines Lexikon der Bildenden Künstler von der Antike bis zur Gegenwart, Vol.33: Theodotos–Urlaub. E. A. Seemann, Leipzig 1939, pg.24

External links 

 
 "Franz Thiele", entry @ AbART
 "Franz Thiele (1868-1945) , entry at the Moravské zemské muzeum, Muzejní autority

1868 births
1945 deaths
Czech painters
Genre painters
Landscape painters
Academy of Fine Arts Vienna alumni
Academic staff of the Academy of Fine Arts, Prague
People from Liberec District